Rafail Melissopoulos (born 12 February 1997) is a Greek professional footballer who plays as a forward for Football League club Kavala.

References

1997 births
Living people
Greek footballers
Xanthi F.C. players
Apollon Paralimnio F.C. players
Greece youth international footballers
Super League Greece players
Association football midfielders
Footballers from Xanthi